T. Siva is an Indian film producer and distributor in Chennai, India. He has produced 23 films including Saroja and Kanimozhi. He owns the production company, Amma Creations. He is best known for Aravindhan (in which he introduced Yuvan Shankar Raja), Saroja and Aravaan.

Career
In the late 1990s, Siva faced economic problems following the release of Aravindhan (1997). In early 1999, he attempted to make a comeback though a film titled Conductor Mappillai starring Murali and Swathi but the film was shelved.

Filmography 
As producer

As actor

References

External links
 

Living people
Film producers from Chennai
Tamil film producers
Male actors in Tamil cinema
Year of birth missing (living people)